WCSE was a radio station on 1450 kHz in Myrtle Beach, South Carolina, that began broadcasting in 1948. It was deleted, as WKEL, in 1996, following a long period when it was off the air.

History

WMRA went on the air on June 10, 1948. It was owned by the Myrtle Beach Broadcasting Company and broadcast with 250 watts from studios in the Ocean Front Hotel. Not long after going on the air, Joe C. Ivey sold control of the company to P. T. Watson and L. B. Hyman. A year later, they sold the station to Elizabeth Evans. In 1954, the Coastal Carolina Broadcasting Corporation, a group of three former CBS announcers, acquired WMRA for $28,000 and changed its call letters to WMYB on July 29, 1954. Coastal Carolina also attempted to move the station to a higher-power frequency twice, in 1955 and 1959, attempts that ultimately went nowhere. In 1961, WMYB was sold to the Golden Strand Broadcasting Company for $150,000; that year, the station was approved for a daytime power increase to 1,000 watts. Golden Strand was acquired in 1964 by Clarence McRae Smith, Jr. and John T. Stanko, after having been granted a construction permit for an FM station on 92.1 MHz earlier that year; on January 11, 1965, WMYB-FM signed on the air; in 1976, the station aired middle-of-the-road music.

Tom Fowler, later vice president for radio with South Carolina Educational Television, made his debut on WMYB the night of the 1967 fire that killed three Apollo 1 astronauts. In 2002 he said, "The Teletypes went nuts. I thought we were at war. That was the real start of an adventure."

Smith and Stanko sold WMYB-AM-FM in 1981 to Rawley Communications Corporation for $700,000, starting a decade that featured two more station sales; WMYB became WQOK at some point in 1982. PhDian Communications, Inc. spent $318,750 to acquire WQOK AM in 1983, separating it from the FM, only to have transfer of control change a year later. Ocean Properties Management of Myrtle Beach acquired the station in 1985 and changed its call letters to WCSE.

Ocean did not own WCSE, by this point an adult standards station (with a format from the Satellite Music Network) with Atlanta Braves baseball and Clemson Tigers football coverage, very long before pursuing a sale. The format was oldies in 1985. On November 13, 1986, the station was put up for auction. Not meeting with buyers, Ocean attempted to sell the station to Keith E. Lamonica in 1987; the sale attempt fell through, but the WKEL call letters, taking after his initials, stuck with the station for the rest of its life. Ocean tried to sell WKEL again, in 1988, to no avail. The station was silent by the time the National Association of Broadcasters wrote a May 29, 1992 letter to the FCC on media ownership rules.

When WKEL's license was finally canceled in January 1996, the other AM station in Myrtle Beach, daytime-only WKZQ (now WWHK) at 1520, filed to relocate to the 1450 facility; WKZQ signed on at 1450 kHz on December 23, 1996, increasing their nighttime power, and is currently on the air 24/7.

References

External links
FCC History Cards for WCSE

Myrtle Beach, South Carolina
CSE
Radio stations established in 1948
1948 establishments in South Carolina
Defunct radio stations in the United States
Radio stations disestablished in 1996
1996 disestablishments in South Carolina
CSE